The Häme Insurrection is an event described in a papal letter from Pope Gregory IX to the archbishop of Uppsala dated 9 December 1237.

The letter describes how the Tavastians went back to their pagan beliefs from Christianity and destroyed the Catholic Church in Häme, Finland. The letter goes into detail in describing atrocities that Tavastians had done. This has been seen as papal propaganda.

In the letter the Pope urges Christian men to take up arms against Tavastians due to their actions.

Sources 

13th century in Finland
1237 in Europe
Persecution of Pagans